Rolling Fork is a  river in southwest Arkansas. It is dammed by DeQueen Dam and forms DeQueen Lake. It is a tributary of the Little River, running parallel with other tributaries such as the Cossatot River, the Saline River, the Mountain Fork, and the Glover River. It is part of the Mississippi watershed.

Location

Mouth Confluence with the Little River in Sevier County, Arkansas 
Source Polk County, Arkansas

Course
Rolling Fork starts near Hatton, Arkansas. It flows south through Wickes and Grannis. About ten miles from its source Rolling Fork flows into DeQueen Lake, a man-made reservoir.  Near Chapel Hill and DeQueen, Arkansas, Rolling Fork exits the lake and continues until it reaches the Little River.

See also
List of Arkansas rivers

References

Sources

External links

Rivers of Arkansas
Tributaries of the Red River of the South
Bodies of water of Sevier County, Arkansas
Rivers of Polk County, Arkansas